İlker Erbay (born 14 June 1984) is a Turkish former footballer.

References

1984 births
Footballers from Istanbul
Living people
Turkish footballers
Association football midfielders
Galatasaray S.K. footballers
Elazığspor footballers
Beylerbeyi S.K. footballers
Mersin İdman Yurdu footballers
Gaziantep F.K. footballers
Kocaelispor footballers
Kayseri Erciyesspor footballers
Orduspor footballers
Tepecikspor footballers
Fethiyespor footballers
Alanyaspor footballers
Turanspor footballers
Bayrampaşaspor footballers
Süper Lig players
TFF First League players
TFF Second League players
TFF Third League players